The Hucknall Sixth Form Centre is a coeducational sixth form centre located in Hucknall, Nottinghamshire, England.

It opened in September 2016 and is home to the collaborative sixth form of The National Academy, The Holgate Academy and Queen Elizabeth's Academy.

References

External links
Hucknall Sixth Form Centre website

Educational institutions established in 2016
Ashfield District
Further education colleges in Nottinghamshire
Sixth form colleges in Nottinghamshire
2016 establishments in England